Aura García-Junco (born 1988) is a Mexican writer. She was born in Mexico City and studied literature at UNAM. Her debut novel Anticitera, artefacto dentado appeared in 2019. This will be followed by a book of essays in 2021 and a second novel, Mar de piedra, due for publication in 2022. 

She has been a fellow of the Foundation for Mexican Literature (2016) and the FONCA Young Artists programme (2014, 2017 and 2021). In 2021, she was named by Granta magazine as one of the best young writers in the Spanish language.

References

Mexican writers
1988 births
Living people
Writers from Mexico City